Grace Brewster Hopper (December 9, 1906 – January 1, 1992) was an American computer scientist, mathematician, and United States Navy rear admiral. One of the first programmers of the Harvard Mark I computer, she was a pioneer of computer programming who invented one of the first linkers. Hopper was the first to devise the theory of machine-independent programming languages, and the FLOW-MATIC programming language she created using this theory was later extended to create COBOL, an early high-level programming language still in use today.

Prior to joining the Navy, Hopper earned a Ph.D. in mathematics from Yale University and was a professor of mathematics at Vassar College. Hopper attempted to enlist in the Navy during World War II but was rejected because she was 34 years old. She instead joined the Navy Reserves. Hopper began her computing career in 1944 when she worked on the Harvard Mark I team led by Howard H. Aiken. In 1949, she joined the Eckert–Mauchly Computer Corporation and was part of the team that developed the UNIVAC I computer. At Eckert–Mauchly she managed the development of one of the first COBOL compilers. She believed that a programming language based on English was possible.  Her compiler converted English terms into machine code understood by computers. By 1952, Hopper had finished her program linker (originally called a compiler), which was written for the A-0 System. During her wartime service, she co-authored three papers based on her work on the Harvard Mark 1.

In 1954, Eckert–Mauchly chose Hopper to lead their department for automatic programming, and she led the release of some of the first compiled languages like FLOW-MATIC. In 1959, she participated in the CODASYL consortium, which consulted Hopper to guide them in creating a machine-independent programming language. This led to the COBOL language, which was inspired by her idea of a language being based on English words. In 1966, she retired from the Naval Reserve, but in 1967 the Navy recalled her to active duty. She retired from the Navy in 1986 and found work as a consultant for the Digital Equipment Corporation, sharing her computing experiences.

The U.S. Navy  guided-missile destroyer  was named for her, as was the Cray XE6 "Hopper" supercomputer at NERSC. During her lifetime, Hopper was awarded 40 honorary degrees from universities across the world. A college at Yale University was renamed in her honor.  In 1991, she received the National Medal of Technology. On November 22, 2016, she was posthumously awarded the Presidential Medal of Freedom by President Barack Obama.

Early life and education

Grace Brewster Murray was born in New York City. She was the eldest of three children. Her parents, Walter Fletcher Murray and Mary Campbell Van Horne, were of Scottish and Dutch descent, and attended West End Collegiate Church. Her great-grandfather, Alexander Wilson Russell, an admiral in the US Navy, fought in the Battle of Mobile Bay during the Civil War.

Grace was very curious as a child; this was a lifelong trait. At the age of seven, she decided to determine how an alarm clock worked and dismantled seven alarm clocks before her mother realized what she was doing (she was then limited to one clock). For her preparatory school education, she attended the Hartridge School in Plainfield, New Jersey. Grace was initially rejected for early admission to Vassar College at age 16 (because her test scores in Latin were too low), but she was admitted the following year. She graduated Phi Beta Kappa from Vassar in 1928 with a bachelor's degree in mathematics and physics and earned her master's degree at Yale University in 1930.

In 1930, Grace Murray married New York University professor Vincent Foster Hopper (1906–1976); they divorced in 1945. Although she did not marry again, she retained his surname.

In 1934, Hopper earned a Ph.D. in mathematics from Yale under the direction of Øystein Ore. Her dissertation, "New Types of Irreducibility Criteria", was published that same year. She began teaching mathematics at Vassar in 1931, and was promoted to associate professor in 1941.

Career

World War II

Hopper tried to enlist in the Navy early in World War II. She was rejected for a few reasons. At age 34, she was too old to enlist, and her weight to height ratio was too low. She was also denied on the basis that her job as a mathematician and mathematics professor at Vassar College was valuable to the war effort. During the war in 1943, Hopper obtained a leave of absence from Vassar and was sworn into the United States Navy Reserve; she was one of many women who volunteered to serve in the WAVES. 

She reported in December and trained at the Naval Reserve Midshipmen's School at Smith College in Northampton, Massachusetts. Hopper graduated first in her class in 1944, and was assigned to the Bureau of Ships Computation Project at Harvard University as a lieutenant, junior grade. She served on the Mark I computer programming staff headed by Howard H. Aiken. 

Hopper and Aiken co-authored three papers on the Mark I, also known as the Automatic Sequence Controlled Calculator. Hopper's request to transfer to the regular Navy at the end of the war was declined due to her advanced age of 38. She continued to serve in the Navy Reserve. Hopper remained at the Harvard Computation Lab until 1949, turning down a full professorship at Vassar in favor of working as a research fellow under a Navy contract at Harvard.

UNIVAC
In 1949, Hopper became an employee of the Eckert–Mauchly Computer Corporation as a senior mathematician and joined the team developing the UNIVAC I. Hopper also served as UNIVAC director of Automatic Programming Development for Remington Rand. The UNIVAC was the first known large-scale electronic computer to be on the market in 1950, and was more competitive at processing information than the Mark I.

When Hopper recommended the development of a new programming language that would use entirely English words, she "was told very quickly that [she] couldn't do this because computers didn't understand English." Still, she persisted. "It's much easier for most people to write an English statement than it is to use symbols," she explained. "So I decided data processors ought to be able to write their programs in English, and the computers would translate them into machine code."

Her idea was not accepted for three years. In the meantime, she published her first paper on the subject, compilers, in 1952. In the early 1950s, the company was taken over by the Remington Rand corporation, and it was while she was working for them that her original compiler work was done. The program was known as the A compiler and its first version was A-0.

In 1952, she had an operational link-loader, which at the time was referred to as a compiler. She later said that "Nobody believed that," and that she "had a running compiler and nobody would touch it. They told me computers could only do arithmetic."

In 1954 Hopper was named the company's first director of automatic programming. Beginning in 1954, Hopper's work was influenced by the Laning and Zierler system, which was the first compiler to accept algebraic notation as input. Her department released some of the first compiler-based programming languages, including MATH-MATIC and FLOW-MATIC.

Hopper said that her compiler  A-0, "translated mathematical notation into machine code. Manipulating symbols was fine for mathematicians but it was no good for data processors who were not symbol manipulators. Very few people are really symbol manipulators. If they are, they become professional mathematicians, not data processors. It's much easier for most people to write an English statement than it is to use symbols. So I decided data processors ought to be able to write their programs in English, and the computers would translate them into machine code. That was the beginning of COBOL, a computer language for data processors. I could say 'Subtract income tax from pay' instead of trying to write that in octal code or using all kinds of symbols. COBOL is the major language used today in data processing."

COBOL

In the spring of 1959, computer experts from industry and government were brought together in a two-day conference known as the Conference on Data Systems Languages (CODASYL). Hopper served as a technical consultant to the committee, and many of her former employees served on the short-term committee that defined the new language COBOL (an acronym for COmmon Business-Oriented Language). The new language extended Hopper's FLOW-MATIC language with some ideas from the IBM equivalent, COMTRAN.  Hopper's belief that programs should be written in a language that was close to English (rather than in machine code or in languages close to machine code, such as assembly languages) was captured in the new business language, and COBOL went on to be the most ubiquitous business language to date. Among the members of the committee that worked on COBOL was Mount Holyoke College alumna Jean E. Sammet.

From 1967 to 1977, Hopper served as the director of the Navy Programming Languages Group in the Navy's Office of Information Systems Planning and was promoted to the rank of captain in 1973. She developed validation software for COBOL and its compiler as part of a COBOL standardization program for the entire Navy.

Standards
In the 1970s, Hopper advocated for the Defense Department to replace large, centralized systems with networks of small, distributed computers. Any user on any computer node could access common databases located on the network. She developed the implementation of standards for testing computer systems and components, most significantly for early programming languages such as FORTRAN and COBOL. The Navy tests for conformance to these standards led to significant convergence among the programming language dialects of the major computer vendors. In the 1980s, these tests (and their official administration) were assumed by the National Bureau of Standards (NBS), known today as the National Institute of Standards and Technology (NIST).

Retirement

In accordance with Navy attrition regulations, Hopper retired from the Naval Reserve with the rank of commander at age 60 at the end of 1966. She was recalled to active duty in August 1967 for a six-month period that turned into an indefinite assignment. She again retired in 1971 but was again asked to return to active duty in 1972. She was promoted to captain in 1973 by Admiral Elmo R. Zumwalt Jr.

After Republican Representative Philip Crane saw her on a March 1983 segment of 60 Minutes, he championed , a joint resolution originating in the House of Representatives, which led to her promotion on 15 December 1983 to commodore by special Presidential appointment by President Ronald Reagan. She remained on active duty for several years beyond mandatory retirement by special approval of Congress. Effective November 8, 1985, the rank of commodore was renamed rear admiral (lower half) and Hopper became one of the Navy's few female admirals.

Following a career that spanned more than 42 years, Rear Admiral Hopper took retirement from the Navy on August 14, 1986.

At the time of her retirement, she was the oldest active-duty commissioned officer in the United States Navy (79 years, eight months and five days), and had her retirement ceremony aboard the oldest commissioned ship in the United States Navy (188 years, nine months and 23 days). 

Admirals William D. Leahy, Chester W. Nimitz, Hyman G. Rickover and Charles Stewart were the only other officers in the Navy's history to serve on active duty at a higher age. Leahy and Nimitz served on active duty for life due to their promotions to the rank of fleet admiral.

Admiral Hopper was the first ever person to be profiled twice on 60 Minutes, first in March of 1983, and the second on 24-August-1986.

Post-retirement
Following her retirement from the Navy, she was hired as a senior consultant to Digital Equipment Corporation (DEC). Hopper was initially offered a position by Rita Yavinsky, but she insisted on going through the typical formal interview process. She then proposed in jest that she would be willing to accept a position which made her available on alternating Thursdays, exhibited at their museum of computing as a pioneer, in exchange for a generous salary and unlimited expense account. Instead, she was hired as a full-time Principal Corporate Consulting Engineer, a tech-track SVP-equivalent. In this position, Hopper represented the company at industry forums, serving on various industry committees, along with other obligations. She retained that position until her death at age 85 in 1992.

At DEC Hopper served primarily as a goodwill ambassador. She lectured widely about the early days of computing, her career, and on efforts that computer vendors could take to make life easier for their users. She visited most of Digital's engineering facilities, where she generally received a standing ovation at the conclusion of her remarks. Although no longer a serving officer, she always wore her Navy full dress uniform to these lectures contrary to U.S. Department of Defense policy. In 2016 Hopper received the Presidential Medal of Freedom, the nation’s highest civilian honor, in recognition of her remarkable contributions to the field of computer science.

"The most important thing I've accomplished, other than building the compiler," she said, "is training young people. They come to me, you know, and say, 'Do you think we can do this?' I say, 'Try it.' And I back 'em up. They need that. I keep track of them as they get older and I stir 'em up at intervals so they don't forget to take chances."

Anecdotes

 Throughout much of her later career, Hopper was much in demand as a speaker at various computer-related events. She was well known for her lively and irreverent speaking style, as well as a rich treasury of early war stories. She also received the nickname "Grandma COBOL".
 While she was working on a Mark II Computer at Harvard University in 1947, her associates discovered a moth that was stuck in a relay and impeding the operation of the computer. Upon extraction, the insect was affixed to a log sheet for that day with the notation, “First actual case of bug being found”. While neither she nor her crew members mentioned the exact phrase, "debugging", in their log entries, the case is held as a historical instance of "debugging" a computer and Hopper is credited with popularizing the term in computing. For many decades, the term "bug" for a malfunction had been in use in several fields before being applied to computers. The remains of the moth can be found taped into the group's log book at the Smithsonian Institution's National Museum of American History in Washington, D.C.
 Grace Hopper is famous for her nanoseconds visual aid. People (such as generals and admirals) used to ask her why satellite communication took so long. She started handing out pieces of wire that were just under one foot long——the distance that light travels in one nanosecond. She gave these pieces of wire the metonym "nanoseconds." She was careful to tell her audience that the length of her nanoseconds was actually the maximum distance the signals would travel in a vacuum, and that signals would travel more slowly through the actual wires that were her teaching aids. Later she used the same pieces of wire to illustrate why computers had to be small to be fast. Later, while giving these lectures while working for DEC, she passed out packets of pepper, calling the individual grains of ground pepper picoseconds.
 Jay Elliot described Grace Hopper as appearing to be " 'all Navy', but when you reach inside, you find a 'Pirate' dying to be released."

Death
On New Year's Day 1992, Hopper died in her sleep of natural causes at her home in Arlington County, Virginia; she was 85 years of age. She was interred with full military honors in Arlington National Cemetery.

Dates of rank

Awards and honors

Military awards

Other awards
 1964: Hopper was awarded the Society of Women Engineers Achievement Award, the Society's highest honor, "In recognition of her significant contributions to the burgeoning computer industry as an engineering manager and originator of automatic programming systems." In May 1955, Hopper was one of the founding members of the Society of Women Engineers.
 1969: Hopper was awarded the inaugural Data Processing Management Association Man of the Year award (now called the Distinguished Information Sciences Award).
 1971: The annual Grace Murray Hopper Award for Outstanding Young Computer Professionals was established in 1971 by the Association for Computing Machinery.
1973: Elected to the U.S. National Academy of Engineering.
 1973: First American and the first woman of any nationality to be made a Distinguished Fellow of the British Computer Society.
 1981: Received an Honorary PhD from Clarkson University.
 1982: American Association of University Women Achievement Award and an Honorary Doctor of Science from Marquette University.
 1983: Golden Plate Award of the American Academy of Achievement.
 1985: Honorary Doctor of Letters from Western New England College (now Western New England University).
 1986: Received the Defense Distinguished Service Medal at her retirement.
 1986: Received an Honorary Doctor of Science from Syracuse University.
 1987: She became the first Computer History Museum Fellow Award Recipient "for contributions to the development of programming languages, for standardization efforts, and for lifelong naval service."
 1988: Received the Golden Gavel Award, Toastmasters International.
 1991: National Medal of Technology.
 1991: Elected a Fellow of the American Academy of Arts and Sciences.
 1992: The Society of Women Engineers established three annual, renewable, "Admiral Grace Murray Hopper Scholarships"
 1994: Inducted into the National Women's Hall of Fame.
 1996:  was launched. Nicknamed Amazing Grace, it is on a very short list of U.S. military vessels named after women.
 2001: Eavan Boland wrote a poem dedicated to Grace Hopper titled "Code" in her 2001 release Against Love Poetry.
 2001: The Gracies, the Government Technology Leadership Award were named in her honor.
 2009: The Department of Energy's National Energy Research Scientific Computing Center named its flagship system "Hopper".
 2009: Office of Naval Intelligence creates the Grace Hopper Information Services Center.
 2013: Google made the Google Doodle for Hopper's 107th birthday an animation of her sitting at a computer, using COBOL to print out her age. At the end of the animation, a moth flies out of the computer.
 2016: On November 22, 2016, Hopper was posthumously awarded a Presidential Medal of Freedom for her accomplishments in the field of computer science.
 2017: Hopper College at Yale University was named in her honor.
 2021: The Admiral Grace Hopper Award was established by the chancellor of the College of Information and Cyberspace (CIC) of the National Defense University to recognize leaders in the fields of information and cybersecurity throughout the National Security community.

Legacy

 Grace Hopper was awarded 40 honorary degrees from universities worldwide during her lifetime.
 Born with Curiosity: The Grace Hopper Story is an upcoming documentary film.
 Nvidia is naming its upcoming CPU generation Grace and GPU generation Hopper after Grace Hopper. 
 The Navy's Hopper Information Services Center is named for her.
 The Navy named a guided-missile destroyer Hopper after her.
 On 30 June 2021, a satellite named after her (ÑuSat 20 or "Grace", COSPAR 2021-059AU) was launched into space.

Places
 Grace Hopper Avenue in Monterey, California, is the location of the Navy's Fleet Numerical Meteorology and Oceanography Center as well as the National Weather Service's San Francisco Bay Area forecast office.
Grace M. Hopper Navy Regional Data Automation Center at Naval Air Station, North Island, California.
Grace Murray Hopper Park, located on South Joyce Street in Arlington County, Virginia, is a small memorial park in front of her former residence (River House Apartments) and is now owned by Arlington County, Virginia.
 Brewster Academy, a school located in Wolfeboro, New Hampshire, United States, dedicated their computer lab to her in 1985, calling it the Grace Murray Hopper Center for Computer Learning. The academy bestows a Grace Murray Hopper Prize to a graduate who excelled in the field of computer systems. Hopper had spent her childhood summers at a family home in Wolfeboro.
 Grace Hopper College, one of the residential colleges of Yale University.
 An administration building on Naval Support Activity Annapolis (previously known as Naval Station Annapolis) in Annapolis, Maryland is named the Grace Hopper Building in her honor.
 Vice Admiral Walter E. "Ted" Carter announced on September 8, 2016 at the Athena Conference that the Naval Academy's newest Cyber Operations building would be named Hopper Hall after Admiral Grace Hopper. This is the first building at any service academy named after a woman. In his words, Grace Hopper was "the admiral of the cyber seas."
 The US Naval Academy also owns a Cray XC-30 supercomputer named "Grace," hosted at the University of Maryland-College Park.
 Building 1482 aboard Naval Air Station North Island, housing the Naval Computer and Telecommunication Station San Diego, is named the Grace Hopper Building, and also contains the History of Naval Communications Museum.
 Building 6007, C2/CNT West in Aberdeen Proving Ground, Maryland, is named after her.
 The street outside of the Nathan Deal Georgia Cyber Innovation and Training Center in Augusta, Georgia, is named Grace Hopper Lane.
 Grace Hopper Academy is a for-profit immersive programming school in New York City named in Grace Hopper's honor. It opened in January 2016 with the goal of increasing the proportion of women in software engineering careers.
 A bridge over Goose Creek, to join the north and south sides of the Naval Support Activity Charleston side of Joint Base Charleston, South Carolina, is named the Grace Hopper Memorial Bridge in her honor.
 Minor planet 5773 Hopper discovered by Eleanor Helin is named in her honor. The official naming citation was published by the Minor Planet Center on 8 November 2019.
 Grace Hopper Hall, a community meeting hall in Orlando, Florida (located on the site of the former Orlando Naval Training Center) is named for her.

Programs
 Women at Microsoft Corporation formed an employee group called Hoppers and established a scholarship in her honor.
 Beginning in 2015, one of the nine competition fields at the FIRST Robotics Competition world championship is named for Hopper.
 A named professorship in the Department of Computer Sciences was established at Yale University in her honor. Joan Feigenbaum was named to this chair in 2008.
 In 2020, Google named its new undersea network cable 'Grace Hopper'. The cable will connect the US, UK and Spain and is estimated to be completed by 2022.

In popular culture 

 In his comic book series, Secret Coders by Gene Luen Yang, the main character is named Hopper Gracie-Hu.
 Since 2013, Hopper's official portrait has been included in the matplotlib python library as sample data to replace the controversial Lenna image.

Grace Hopper Celebration of Women in Computing
Her legacy was an inspiring factor in the creation of the Grace Hopper Celebration of Women in Computing. Held yearly, this conference is designed to bring the research and career interests of women in computing to the forefront.

See also

 Code: Debugging the Gender Gap
 Grace Hopper Celebration of Women in Computing
 List of pioneers in computer science
 Systems engineering
 Women in computing
 Women in the United States Navy
 List of female United States military generals and flag officers
 Timeline of women in science

Notes

Obituary notices
 Betts, Mitch (Computerworld 26: 14, 1992)
 Bromberg, Howard (IEEE Software 9: 103–104, 1992)
 Danca, Richard A. (Federal Computer Week 6: 26–27, 1992)
 Hancock, Bill (Digital Review 9: 40, 1992)
 Power, Kevin (Government Computer News 11: 70, 1992)
 Sammet, J. E.  (Communications of the ACM 35 (4): 128–131, 1992)
 Weiss, Eric A. (IEEE Annals of the History of Computing 14: 56–58, 1992)

References

Further reading
 
 
 
 
  Williams' book focuses on the lives and contributions of four notable women scientists: Mary Sears (1905–1997); Florence van Straten (1913–1992); Grace Murray Hopper (1906–1992); Mina Spiegel Rees (1902–1997).

External links
 

 Oral History of Captain Grace Hopper – Interviewed by: Angeline Pantages 1980, Naval Data Automation Command, Maryland.
  from Chips, the United States Navy information technology magazine.
 Grace Hopper: Navy to the Core, a Pirate at Heart  (2014), To learn more about Hopper's story and Navy legacy navy.mil.
 The Queen of Code (2015), a documentary film about Grace Hopper produced by FiveThirtyEight.
 Norwood, Arlisha. "Grace Hopper". National Women's History Museum. 2017.
 

1906 births
1992 deaths
American computer programmers
American computer scientists
COBOL
Programming language designers
American women computer scientists
Women inventors
American women mathematicians
United States Navy rear admirals (lower half)
Female admirals of the United States Navy
Fellows of the American Academy of Arts and Sciences
Fellows of the British Computer Society
National Medal of Technology recipients
Recipients of the Defense Distinguished Service Medal
Recipients of the Legion of Merit
Recipients of the Meritorious Service Medal (United States)
Harvard University people
Vassar College faculty
Military personnel from New York City
Vassar College alumni
Yale University alumni
American people of Dutch descent
American people of Scottish descent
Burials at Arlington National Cemetery
20th-century American engineers
20th-century American mathematicians
20th-century American scientists
20th-century American women scientists
Presidential Medal of Freedom recipients
Computer science educators
American software engineers
20th-century women mathematicians
Mathematicians from New York (state)
Wardlaw-Hartridge School alumni
WAVES personnel